Schmitt-Presser Museum (Portuguese: Museu Comunitário Casa Schmitt-Presser) is a historical museum in the Hamburgo Velho district of Novo Hamburgo, Brazil. It was originally constructed as a mansion in the first half of the nineteenth century by Johann Peter Schmitt, a German immigrant. It is one of the oldest examples of German architecture in Rio Grande do Sul state. In 1974, the artist Ernesto Frederico Scheffel decided to take the first step of preserving the house and in 1981, was declared a public utility by the city and listed by IPHAN, four years later. In 1992, the building was opened to the public as House Community Museum Schmitt-Presser.

References

Houses completed in 1890
Museums in Rio Grande do Sul
Neoclassical architecture in Brazil
Novo Hamburgo
Historic house museums in Brazil
Museums established in 1992